Azerbaijan competed at the 2013 World Games held in Cali, Colombia. In total, two medals were won, both in karate.

Medalists

Karate 

Two medals were won in karate. Rafael Aghayev won the gold medal in the men's kumite 75 kg event and Shahin Atamov won the bronze medal in the men's kumite +84 kg event.

References 

Nations at the 2013 World Games
2013 in Azerbaijani sport
2013